Soulsation! is a 4-CD box set of music recorded by The Jackson 5 during their tenure at Motown Records from 1969 to 1975, when they left Motown for CBS Records. The box set was released in 1995 to celebrate the 25th anniversary of The Jackson 5 becoming the first group to have its first four singles go straight to #1 on the US Billboard charts. Soulsation! included an introduction from the group's youngest sister Janet, liner notes from David Ritz and an essay from the brothers' first producer, Bobby Taylor. The fourth disc features 17 previously unreleased songs, most recorded from mid-1969 to early 1972. The set also includes solo numbers from brothers Michael, Jermaine, and Jackie.

Songs from all of The Jackson 5's studio albums from 1969 to 1975 are included here, as well as half of the 1976 album of unreleased material Joyful Jukebox Music (though nothing from the similar Boogie album of 1979 and no live recordings). ABC (1970) and Skywriter (1973) are the two most prominently-featured albums on the compilation, with seven tracks from each appearing on Soulsation!. The Jackson 5 albums with the fewest songs included are the Jackson 5 Christmas Album (1970) and Maybe Tomorrow (1971), with two and three tracks respectively. The only solo Jackson albums not represented from that time period are Jermaine's Come into My Life (1973), and Michael's Music & Me (1973) and Farewell My Summer Love, which although released by Motown in 1984, was actually recorded in 1973.

Track listing

Soulsation!  - Disc four (Rare & Unreleased)
"Can't Get Ready for Losing You" (originally performed by Willie Hutch and also recorded by The Miracles) - 3:48 
"You Ain't Giving Me What I Want (So I'm Taking It All Back)" - 4:23
"Reach Out I'll Be There" (originally performed by The Four Tops) - 3:44
"I'm Glad It Rained" - 4:02 
"A Fool for You" (originally performed by Ray Charles) - 4:33
"It's Your Thing" (originally performed by The Isley Brothers) - 3:40
"Everybody Is a Star" (originally performed by Sly and the Family Stone) - 3:01
"I Need You" (Jermaine Jackson) - 3:25 
"Ooh, I'd Love to Be with You" (*) (from the album Skywriter) - 2:46 
"Just a Little Misunderstanding" (originally performed by The Contours) - 2:40
"Jamie" - 3:30 
"Ask the Lonely" (originally performed by The Four Tops) - 3:24
"We Can Have Fun" - 3:21 
"I Hear a Symphony" (originally performed by The Supremes) - 2:32
"Let's Have a Party" - 3:10 
"Love Scenes" - 2:40 
"LuLu" - 2:39 
"Money Honey" (originally performed by The Drifters) - 2:55
"Coming Home" - 3:04

Total length: 63:36

Notes:

(*) Track 9 was originally supposed to be "You're the Only One" (as on the original back cover art), but was replaced at the last minute.

-"Ooh, I'd Love to Be with You" originally appeared on the album Skywriter, and a longer, alternate version of "I Hear a Symphony" was previously included on the Michael Jackson compilation album Looking Back to Yesterday in 1986. All 17 other tracks from Disc Four are new releases, making this the single largest number of archival Jackson 5 studio recordings released between 1975 (when the group left Motown Records) and the 2012 compilation Come and Get It: The Rare Pearls, which includes 29 previously unreleased Jackson 5 songs.

-A remix of "It's Your Thing" called "The J5 In '95 Extended Remix" (5:57) was included on the one-disc condensed version of this box set called Jackson 5: The Ultimate Collection (1995).

-A different remix of "It's Your Thing" called "The J5 in '95 House Remix" (4:47) appears only on the original 1995 UK version of The Ultimate Collection, where it was titled The Very Best of Michael Jackson with the Jackson Five. When the UK collection was reissued in 2001, this was the only track removed from the compilation.

References

1995 compilation albums
Motown compilation albums
The Jackson 5 compilation albums